Andrew Vincent is a New Zealand former professional rugby league footballer who played for the North Sydney Bears.

Playing career
A junior in the Canterbury Rugby League competition, Vincent played for the Junior Kiwis in 1985 and 1986. He was selected for the New Zealand Māori squad at the 1986 Pacific Cup, but had to pull out due to injury. He spent the 1988 NSWRL season in Sydney with the North Sydney Bears, playing in one first grade match.

He then returned to New Zealand and became a regular in the Canterbury side. In 1994, with the launch of the Lion Red Cup, Vincent joined the Christchurch City Shiners.

References

Living people
New Zealand rugby league players
Canterbury rugby league team players
North Sydney Bears players
Rugby league five-eighths
New Zealand Māori rugby league players
Place of birth missing (living people)
Year of birth missing (living people)
Junior Kiwis players